7 Aquilae is a star in the equatorial constellation of Aquila, located 359 light years away from the Sun. 7 Aquilae is the Flamsteed designation. It is visible to the naked eye as a faint, yellow-white hued star with a baseline apparent visual magnitude of 6.9.

Houk and Swift (1999) find a stellar classification of F0IV, matching an F-type subgiant star that has exhausted the hydrogen at its core and is evolving into a giant. Fox Machado et al. (2010) found a class of F0V, suggesting it is still a main sequence star. This is a pulsating variable star of the Delta Scuti type. It has double the mass of the Sun and 2.7 times the Sun's radius.

References

F-type main-sequence stars
F-type subgiants
Delta Scuti variables
Circumstellar disks
Aquila (constellation)
Aquilae, V1728
BD-03 4390
Aquilae, 07
174532
092501